In economics, an inferior good is a good whose demand decreases when consumer income rises (or demand increases when consumer income decreases), unlike normal goods, for which the opposite is observed. Normal goods are those goods for which the demand rises as consumer income rises.

Inferiority, in this sense, is an observable fact relating to affordability rather than a statement about the quality of the good. As a rule, these goods are affordable and adequately fulfill their purpose, but as more costly substitutes that offer more pleasure (or at least variety) become available, the use of the inferior goods diminishes. Direct relations can thus be drawn from inferior goods to socio-economic class. Those with constricted incomes tend to prefer inferior goods for the reason of the aforementioned observable inferiority.

Depending on consumer or market indifference curves, the amount of a good bought can either increase, decrease, or stay the same when income increases.

Examples
There are many examples of inferior goods. A number of economists have suggested that shopping at large discount chains such as Walmart and rent-to-own establishments vastly represent a large percentage of goods referred to as "inferior".  Cheaper cars are examples of the inferior goods. Consumers will generally prefer cheaper cars when their income is constricted. As a consumer's income increases, the demand for the cheap cars will decrease, while demand for costly cars will increase, so cheap cars are inferior goods.

Inter-city bus service is also an example of an inferior good. This form of transportation is cheaper than air or rail travel, but is more time-consuming. When money is constricted, traveling by bus becomes more acceptable, but when money is more abundant than time, more rapid transport is preferred. In some countries with less developed or poorly maintained railways this is reversed: trains are slower and cheaper than buses, so rail travel is an inferior good.

Certain financial services, including payday lending, are inferior goods. Such financial services are generally marketed to persons with low incomes. People with middle or higher incomes can typically use credit cards that have better terms of payment or bank loans for higher volumes and much lower rates of interest.

Inexpensive foods like instant noodles, bologna, pizza, hamburger, mass-market beer, frozen dinners, and canned goods are additional examples of inferior goods. As incomes rise, one tends to purchase more expensive, appealing or nutritious foods. Likewise, goods and services used by poor people for which richer people have alternatives exemplify inferior goods. As a rule, used and obsolete goods (but not antiques) marketed to persons of low income as  closeouts are inferior goods at the time even if they had earlier been normal goods or even luxury goods.

Others are very inconsistent across geographic regions or cultures. The potato, for example, generally conforms to the demand function of an inferior good in the Andean region where the crop originated.  People of higher incomes and/or those who have migrated to coastal areas are more likely to prefer other staples such as rice or wheat products as they can afford them. However, in several countries of Asia, such as Bangladesh, potatoes are not an inferior good, but rather a relatively expensive source of calories and a high-prestige food, especially when eaten in the form of French fries by urban elites.

Income and substitution effects 

The shift in consumer demand for an inferior good can be explained by two natural economic phenomena: The substitution effect and the income effect. These effects describe and validate the movement of the demand curve in (independent) response to increasing income and relative cost of other goods.

Income effect 
The income effect describes the relationship between an increase in real income and demand for a good. The result of the income effect for a normal good is discernible to that of an inferior good in that a positive income change causes a consumer to buy more of a normal good, but less of an inferior good. The increase in real income means consumers can afford a bundle of goods that give them higher utility and contain a lower number of inferior goods. Consumers thus choose to decrease their consumption of inferior goods when real income increases, showing the inverse relation between inferior goods and the income effect.

Substitution effect 
The substitution effect occurs due to a change in relative prices between two or more goods. For both normal and inferior goods, a price increase will lead to a reduction in quantity consumed of the good due to substitute goods being relatively cheaper. Consumers substitute the good in which the price has increased for either cheaper goods of the same observed quality or increase their consumption of other inferior goods.

Overall change in demand for an inferior good 
The income and substitution effects work in opposite directions for an inferior good. When an inferior good’s price decreases, the income effect reduces the quantity consumed, whilst the substitution effect increases the amount consumed. In practice, it has been observed that the substitution effect is usually larger than the income effect due to the small amount of gross income allocated by consumers on any given good, and thus the change in demand is usually insignificant in comparison to the substitution effect.

Giffen goods

A special type of inferior good may exist known as the Giffen good, which would disobey the "law of demand".  Quite simply, when the price of a Giffen good increases, the demand for that good increases. This would have to be a particular good that is such a large proportion of a person or market's consumption that the income effect of a price increase would produce, effectively, more demand. The observed demand curve would slope upward, indicating positive elasticity.

Giffen goods were first noted by Sir Robert Giffen. It is usual to attribute Giffen's observation to the fact that in Ireland during the 19th century there was a rise in the price of potatoes. The explanation follows that poor people were forced to reduce their consumption of meat and expensive items such as eggs. Potatoes, still being the cheapest food, meant that poor people started consuming more even though its price was rising. This phenomenon is often described as "Giffen's Paradox". However, it has been noticed that Giffen did not use potatoes as an example of Giffen goods. Moreover, potatoes were not Giffen Goods during the Great Famine in Ireland. Alfred Marshall's explanation of Giffen's Paradox was presented in terms of bread.

See also 
 Ersatz
 Substitute good
 Kuznets curve

References

Goods (economics)